5th is the fifth album by Lee Michaels and was released in 1971. It reached #16 on the Billboard Top LPs chart.

The album featured three singles: "Do You Know What I Mean", which reached #6 on the Billboard Hot 100, "Can I Get a Witness", which reached #39 on the Billboard Hot 100, and "Rock Me Baby" which did not chart. The album's title is a reference to "Can I Get a Witness"; the Fifth Amendment to the United States Constitution deals with the rights of witnesses to refuse to give testimony that will incriminate themselves.

Track listing
All songs written by Lee Michaels except where noted.
 "Keep the Circle Turning" (featuring Merry Clayton) (Joel Christie) – 2:41
 "You Are What You Do" - 2:58
 "Willie & the Hand Jive" (Johnny Otis) - 3:02
 "Didn't Have to Happen" - 2:32
 "Rock Me Baby" (Riley King/Joe Josea) - 2:28
 "Do You Know What I Mean" - 3:11
 "Ya Ya" (Lee Dorsey/Clarence Lewis/Morgan Robinson/Morris Levy) - 2:19
 "Can I Get a Witness" (Brian Holland/Lamont Dozier/Eddie Holland) – 3:02
 "Oak Fire" – 2:53
 "I Don't Want Her" – 2:25

Personnel

Musicians
 Lee Michaels – lead vocals, organ, piano
 Jackie Kelso – saxophone
 Joel Larson – drums

Technical
 Lee Michaels – producer
 Henry Lewy, Norm Kinney, Richard Madrid – engineers
 Roland Young – art direction
 Jim McCrary – photography

Charts

Singles

References

1971 albums
Lee Michaels albums
A&M Records albums